Local elections were held in Cabuyao on May 9, 2022, as part of the 2022 Philippine general election. The voters elected for the elective local posts in the city: the mayor, vice mayor, and ten councilors.

Overview
Incumbent Mayor Rommel Gecolea is seeking his third term with Councilor Leif Laiglon Opiña as his running mate. Their opponent is the tandem of Dennis Felipe Hain and Evelyn Del Rosario of  Aksyon Demokratiko.

Candidates

Results
Here are the official results of the election:

Mayor

Vice Mayor

Councilors

|-bgcolor=black
|colspan=8|

References

External links

2022 Philippine local elections
Elections in Cabuyao